The 1919 Brooklyn Robins finished the season in fifth place.

Offseason 
 February 1, 1919: Jake Daubert was traded by the Robins to the Cincinnati Reds for Tommy Griffith.

Regular season

Season standings

Record vs. opponents

Notable transactions 
 April 14, 1919: Ed Konetchy was purchased by the Robins from the Boston Braves.
 April 18, 1919: Lee Magee was purchased by the Robins from the Cincinnati Reds.
 June 2, 1919: Lee Magee was traded by the Robins to the Chicago Cubs for Pete Kilduff.

Roster

Player stats

Batting

Starters by position 
Note: Pos = Position; G = Games played; AB = At bats; H = Hits; Avg. = Batting average; HR = Home runs; RBI = Runs batted in

Other batters 
Note: G = Games played; AB = At bats; H = Hits; Avg. = Batting average; HR = Home runs; RBI = Runs batted in

Pitching

Starting pitchers 
Note: G = Games pitched; IP = Innings pitched; W = Wins; L = Losses; ERA = Earned run average; SO = Strikeouts

Other pitchers 
Note: G = Games pitched; IP = Innings pitched; W = Wins; L = Losses; ERA = Earned run average; SO = Strikeouts

Relief pitchers 
Note: G = Games pitched; W = Wins; L = Losses; SV = Saves; ERA = Earned run average; SO = Strikeouts

Notes

References 
Baseball-Reference season page
Baseball Almanac season page

External links 
1919 Brooklyn Robins uniform
Brooklyn Dodgers reference site
Acme Dodgers page 
Retrosheet

Brooklyn Robins
Los Angeles Dodgers seasons
Brooklyn Robins
1910s in Brooklyn
Flatbush, Brooklyn